Bengisu Erçetin (born 1 January 2001) is a Turkish badminton player. Erçetin won the gold medal at the 2018 European Junior Championships, 2022 Mediterranean Games, and the silver medal at the 2018 Mediterranean Games partnered with Nazlıcan İnci.

Erçetin's achievements began when she won the girls' doubles title at the 2016 European U15 Championships in Kazan, Russia partnered with Zehra Erdem, and also won the bronze medal in the singles event. Teamed-up with Nazlıcan İnci, they grabbed the silver medal in the U17 Championships in 2016, and made it to the gold medal in 2017 with Erdem. She won her first senior international tournament at the 2017 Turkey International tournament.

Achievements

Mediterranean Games 
Women's doubles

European Junior Championships 
Girls' doubles

BWF International Challenge/Series (6 titles, 5 runners-up) 
Women's doubles

  BWF International Challenge tournament
  BWF International Series tournament
  BWF Future Series tournament

References

External links 
 

2001 births
Living people
People from Erzincan
Sportspeople from Istanbul
Turkish female badminton players
Competitors at the 2018 Mediterranean Games
Competitors at the 2022 Mediterranean Games
Mediterranean Games gold medalists for Turkey
Mediterranean Games silver medalists for Turkey
Mediterranean Games medalists in badminton
Badminton players at the 2019 European Games
European Games competitors for Turkey
21st-century Turkish sportswomen